Renzo Revoredo Zuazo (born 11 May 1986 in Lima) is a Peruvian footballer who plays for Sporting Cristal and the Peru national football team.

Club career

Early career 
Revoredo made his official debut in the Peruvian First Division on April 11, 2004, for Sporting Cristal in an away match against Deportivo Wanka. The match was for the 7th round of the 2004 Apertura and finished in a 1–1 draw. On the day of his debut Revoredo was 17 years old and played the entire match.

Return to Sporting Cristal 
On August 10, 2011, during the second half of the 2011 season, it was announced that Revoredo left Universitario and signed a one-year and half contract with Sporting Cristal. Revoredo would team up again with Juan Reynoso his coach at Universitario. His first game on his return to Cristal was away to Matute in the Alianza Lima - Sporting Cristal derby. In the derby, Revoredo started alongside center back partner Walter Vilchez and helped Cristal keep a clean-sheet against Alianza, the first placed team in the league at the time.

International career

2011 Copa America 
Revoredo's performances at club level convinced the Peru national football team coach Sergio Markarian to include him in the squad for the 2011 Copa America.

Honours

Club 
Coronel Bolognesi
 Torneo Clausura: 2007
Universitario de Deportes
 Peruvian First Division: 2009
Barcelona Sporting Club
Ecuadorian Serie A: 2012
Perú primera división
-Descentralizado 2014
Perú primera división
-Descentralizado 2016
Perú primera división
-Descentralizado 2018

Country 
Peru national team
 Copa America: Bronze medal 2011

References

External links 
 
 

1986 births
Living people
Footballers from Lima
Peruvian footballers
Peruvian expatriate footballers
Peru international footballers
Association football defenders
Coronel Bolognesi footballers
Club Universitario de Deportes footballers
Sporting Cristal footballers
Club Olimpia footballers
Barcelona S.C. footballers
2011 Copa América players
Copa América Centenario players
Expatriate footballers in Paraguay
Expatriate footballers in Ecuador